Sand Point is an unincorporated community and census-designated place (CDP) on Lake Texoma in Bryan County, Oklahoma, United States. It was first listed as a CDP prior to the 2020 census.

The CDP is in western Bryan County, on the east shore of the Washita River tributary arm of Lake Texoma, an impoundment on the Red River.

Demographics

References 

Census-designated places in Bryan County, Oklahoma
Census-designated places in Oklahoma